Sander Jan Klerk (The Hague, 19 June 1982) is a Dutch actor and singer.

Biography 

Klerk is the youngest son from a family with 2 children. He was born in The Hague and grew up in the Westland region. He studied at the Actorsstudio, Theatreschool Rabarber and the Dutch Musical Ensemble in the Netherlands and the UK.

He began his acting career appearing in various TV series including Baantjer and Onderweg naar Morgen. Klerk was a guest actor in 4 episodes of Het Glazen Huis dramaseries from Endemol.

Klerk starred in the Nickelodeon (TV channel) television series Zoop (TV) in the role of Aaron Zomerkamp. He reprised this role in the feature film "Zoop in Africa". This TV series and film have won various awards, including the "Nickelodeon Kid's Choice Award" and the "Golden film".

His theatre credits include; Grease - (Doody), Jekyll & Hyde - (Simon Stride), and Tita Tovenaar (Tom de Tuinman).

Klerk performed in the John Kraaijkamp Musical Awards Gala's, Musicals in Ahoy' the All Star Musical Gala, and Musical Sing-Along at Amsterdam Uitmarkt.

From 2008 to 2012 Klerk was seen in various international commercials for brands as McDonald's, Domino's Pizza, and Starbucks.

In 2009 Klerk performed with Lea Salonga in concert in New York. In 2012 Klerk performed in Musical Classics in Ahoy in Ahoy Rotterdam. In October 2012 Klerk was backing vocalist for Mika at his European tour “The Origin of Love".
 
Klerk played in the NET 5 TV series “Achter Gesloten Deuren” (Behind Closed Doors) in the role of Thomas Henegouwen, broadcast in fall 2012. In 2015 he appeared in the RTL-series Goede tijden, slechte tijden as Bas Luster.

Following roles in dramaseries as ‘’Moordvrouw (2016) and Suspects (TV series)’’ (2018) Klerk played the role of “Hermann of Thuringia” in the international tv dramaseries “Glow & Darkness” in 2021.

Selected filmography

Television

Film

References

External links

Dutch male film actors
Dutch male musical theatre actors
1982 births
Living people
Dutch male actors
Dutch male television actors
21st-century Dutch male actors
Male actors from The Hague